Plounéour-Trez is a former commune in the Finistère department of Brittany in north-western France. On 1 January 2017, it was merged into the new commune Plounéour-Brignogan-Plages.

Population
Inhabitants of Plounéour-Trez are called in French Plounéour-Tréziens.

See also
Communes of the Finistère department

References

External links

Former communes of Finistère